Maclyn Thomas "Mac" McCutcheon (June 17, 1912 – May 19, 1978) was a Canadian politician and farmer.

Born in Croton, Ontario, he was elected to the House of Commons of Canada in the 1963 federal election as the Progressive Conservative Member of Parliament for Lambton—Kent, and re-elected in the 1965 and 1968 elections.

From 1972 to 1973 he was the Deputy House Leader of the Progressive Conservative Party while they were in opposition.

References

1912 births
1978 deaths
People from Lambton County
Progressive Conservative Party of Canada MPs
Members of the House of Commons of Canada from Ontario